Heads or Tails is a 1997 Quebec comedy film directed by Claude Fournier and starring Roy Dupuis and Patrick Huard

Synopsis
In order to make money fast to put his company back on track, Dominique (Roy Dupuis) encouraged by his business partner Pierre Sanchez (Patrick Huard) finds a job as an antique dealer for Victor (Normand Lévesque). But soon he realizes that the only way he will keep his job is by pretending he is gay, slowly breaking his marriage with his wife Maude (Charlotte Laurier) and stirring weird emotions from his mother Elisabeth (France Castel).

Cast
 Roy Dupuis (Dominique Samson)
 Patrick Huard (Pierre Sanchez)
 Charlotte Laurier (Maude)
 Albert Millaire (De Beauregard)
 Normand Lévesque (Victor)
 Guy Nadon (Dr. Lamoureux)
 France Castel (Elisabeth Ballester)
 Arielle Dombasle (Rose Petipas)
 Sophie Faucher (La Sodoma)
 Nanette Workman (Sandy Klein)
 Jacques Languirand (Igor de Lonsdale)
 Micheline Lanctôt (Huissier Saisibec)
 Jean-Guy Bouchard
 Dan Bigras
 Martin Thibodeau (Motard)
 Claude Rajotte
 Paul Buissonneau (Metteur en scène)
 Annie Dufresne (Sophie)
 Paul-Antoine Taillefer (Hugo)
 Louis Champagne (Minister of Culture)
 Marie-Anne Larochelle (Corinne)
 Xavier Dolan-Tadros (Edouard)
 Maude Guérin (Mimi)
 Jacynthe René (Solange)
 Julien Bessette (Monsieur Corbeil)
 Patrice Robergeau (Taxi driver)
 Martin David Peters (Sacha)
 Luc D'Arcy (Elektra)
 Jean Charest (Anatole Bouffant)
 Luc Charpentier (Andrew L.)
 Yanek Gadzala (De Gaulle)

External links

1997 films
1990s French-language films
Canadian LGBT-related films
Canadian comedy films
LGBT-related comedy films
1997 LGBT-related films
Films directed by Claude Fournier
French-language Canadian films
1990s Canadian films